Looking for Alibrandi may refer to:

 Looking for Alibrandi (novel), a 1992 novel by Australian author Melina Marchetta
 Looking for Alibrandi (film), a 2000 Australian film, based on the novel